Sinop Airport  is an airport in Sinop, in the Black Sea Region of Turkey. Turkish Airlines has daily flights from Istanbul. Tower and approach frequency is 126.300 MHz. The old runway of the airport was previously used by the US military base in Sinop. The IATA code has changed from SIC to NOP.

Airlines and destinations

Traffic Statistics

References

External links
Sinop

 

Airports in Turkey
Buildings and structures in Sinop Province
Transport in Sinop Province